Kisdon Force is a series of waterfalls on the River Swale in Swaledale, England. The falls are situated within the Yorkshire Dales National Park in the county of North Yorkshire, 500 metres downstream from the small hamlet of Keld at grid reference . 

Kisdon Force is one of several waterfalls on the Swale in the Keld area: the others are East Gill Force, Catrake Force and Wain Wath Force. All occur where the river cuts a gorge through the Carboniferous Limestone between the hills of Kisdon and Rogan's Seat. The falls in this area are termed "forces" after the Norse word fors or foss, which means "waterfall". Both upper and lower Kisdon Force can be negotiated by canoeists, although a high degree of skill and experience is needed. The upper falls are rated Grade IV whilst the lower falls are rated more difficult at Grade V.

The falls drop  over two cascades and are surrounded by Kisdon Force Woods, a Site of Special Scientific Interest covering an area of 38 hectares, which consists of mixed broad-leaved woodland with ash, wych elm and rowan dominating. In the spring, primroses grow profusely in the area. The falls can be easily visited by a riverside path from Keld. However, care should be taken since the stones around the falls are often wet and slippery. Visitor numbers to the falls are swollen by walkers along the Pennine Way, a long-distance footpath that passes the falls.

See also
 List of waterfalls of England

References

Waterfalls of North Yorkshire
Swaledale